Louis Adams may refer to:

 Louis Adams (basketball, born 1996), American basketball player
 Louis Adams (basketball, born 1990), Senegalese basketball player